CGS-12066A is a drug which acts as a potent and selective agonist for the 5-HT1B receptor with lower affinity for the three 5-HT2 receptor subtypes. It is used for studying the role of the 5-HT1B receptor in various processes including perception of pain and the sleep-wake cycle.

References 

Serotonin receptor agonists
Trifluoromethyl compounds
Piperazines
Quinoxalines